Michael James Galeota (August 28, 1984 – January 10, 2016) was an American actor. He was best known for his role as Nick Lighter in the Disney Channel series The Jersey.

Early life
Galeota was born in Smithtown, New York. He had three brothers: David, Tony, and Jimmy. Galeota graduated from Bellarmine-Jefferson High School in 2002.

Death
In January 2016, Galeota was hospitalized after complaining of abdominal pains, but left treatment against doctor's orders. On January 10, he was found dead by a friend at his home in Glendale, California. He was 31 years old. No precise cause of death was released, but the Los Angeles County Coroner's office stated that Galeota had several health problems, including hypertension and high cholesterol. He also suffered from diverticulitis. An autopsy was pending 

On September 12, 2016, it was revealed Galeota died as a result of cardiovascular disease and hypertension.

Filmography

Film

Television

References

External links

1984 births
2016 deaths
American male child actors
American male film actors
American male television actors
Male actors from New York (state)
American people of Italian descent
People from Smithtown, New York
20th-century American male actors
21st-century American male actors